John Pasquarelli (born 1937) is an Australian former politician. He served as a member of the House of Assembly of Papua and New Guinea from 1964 to 1968, and as an advisor to One Nation leader Pauline Hanson.

Biography
Born in 1937, Pasquarelli was educated at Ballarat Grammar School before studying law at the University of Queensland. He worked in the opal fields at Coober Pedy for a year, before becoming a cadet patrol officer in the Territory of Papua and New Guinea in 1961. However, in 1962 he resigned in order to work as a crocodile marksman and set up an artefacts business. He subsequently donated numerous items to the Papua New Guinea Museum.

A right-wing conservative and supporter of Rhodesian Prime Minister Ian Smith, Pasquarelli successfully contested the 1964 elections to the new House of Assembly, the first elections held in the territory under universal suffrage, becoming MHA for the Angoram constituency. He did not stand for re-election in 1968 after becoming disillusions by the lack of development in Sepik, and returned to Australia later the same year.

Back in Australia, Pasquarelli unsuccessfully contested the Jagajaga electorate as the Liberal Party candidate in the 1987 federal elections, losing to the incumbent Labor MP Peter Staples. He went to Western Australia in 1996 to assist anti-immigration former Labor MP Graeme Campbell in his re-election campaign as an independent; after the election, he became an advisor to the newly elected MP Pauline Hanson, in which capacity he reportedly wrote her maiden speech. He was sacked by Hanson in December 1996, which he blamed on David Oldfield. Pasquarelli subsequently became a prominent commentator on Hanson and her One Nation party; though he was vehemently critical of Oldfield and other One Nation figures, he remained supportive of Hanson personally. He published a book about his experience with Hanson, The Pauline Hanson Story: By the Man Who Knows in 1998.

Pasquarelli ran as an independent in Bendigo in the 2001 elections, but finished eighth out of nine candidates with only 1,073 votes. In 2017, he worked for Liberal National Party MP George Christensen as an advisor.

See also
Politics of Australia

References

1937 births
Living people
Australian people of Italian descent
People educated at Ballarat Grammar School
University of Queensland alumni
Members of the House of Assembly of Papua and New Guinea
Liberal Party of Australia politicians